Michael Brown (born February 13, 1967), known as Ron Brown, is a former American football linebacker who played in the National Football League from 1987-1989 for the San Diego Chargers and then traded to the Los Angeles Raiders. Brown forsook what might have been a promising track career to play football. While at High School in 1982, he had the seventh-fastest prep high hurdles time in the country, 13.82 seconds.

He recalled that he regularly beat Danny Harris of Perris High in the 300-meter low hurdles. Harris went on to earn a silver medal in the 400-meter hurdles at the 1984 Olympic Games.

Brown's hurdling career took a detour in 1983 when he tore ligaments in his left knee, requiring surgery. A football-related injury to his right knee forced him to red-shirt in 1984.

References

External links
 USC Football Encyclopedia, page 63.

1964 births
Living people
Players of American football from Long Beach, California
American football linebackers
San Diego Chargers players
Los Angeles Raiders players